Known Universe or known universe may refer to
 The entire universe
 The observable universe, the part of the universe that can be observed from Earth
 Known Universe (TV series), a program broadcast by National Geographic
 Known Universe (Ass Ponys album), a 1996 indie rock album
 a misnomer for Known Space, a fictional setting created by Larry Niven